Commonwealth records in athletics are the best marks set in an event by an athlete who competes for a member nation of the Commonwealth of Nations.

Outdoor

Key to tables:

+ = en route to longer distance

h = hand timing

A = affected by altitude

# = not record eligible

a = aided road course according to IAAF rule 260.28

OT = oversized track

est = estimate

Men

Commonwealth best times for non-standard events

Women

Commonwealth best times for non-standard events

Mixed

Indoor

Men

Women

Notes

References

Sport of athletics records
Athletics